Victor Pierre Le Gorgeu (5 May 1881, Quimper, Finistère - 11 September 1963, Paris) was a French politician of France's Third, Fourth and Fifth Republics. Among his offices have been senator for Finistère (1930–1940).

1881 births
1963 deaths
Politicians from Quimper
Radical Party (France) politicians
French Senators of the Third Republic
The Vichy 80
Mayors of places in Brittany
Politicians of the French Fourth Republic
Politicians of the French Fifth Republic
Senators of Finistère